Georgios Ktistopoulos (born 17 August 1996) is a Greek professional footballer who plays as an attacking midfielder for Pierikos, on loan from PAOK.

Club career
On August 12, 2016 it was announced that Ktistopoulos signed a long year season contract with Panserraikos, on loan from PAOK.

References

External links

1996 births
Living people
Greek footballers
Association football midfielders
Greece youth international footballers
Super League Greece players
PAOK FC players
Panserraikos F.C. players
Footballers from Thessaloniki